Petar "Press" Maravich (August 29, 1915 – April 15, 1987) was an American college and professional basketball coach. He received the nickname "Press" as a boy, when one of his jobs was selling the Pittsburgh Press on the streets of his hometown of Aliquippa, Pennsylvania, an industrial city outside of Pittsburgh. Maravich, Sr. also served in the United States Naval Air Corps during World War II.

Maravich graduated from Davis & Elkins College in 1941 and was a member of the Alpha Sigma Phi fraternity. He was the father of basketball player Pete Maravich.

Playing and coaching career
Maravich was the son of Serb immigrants Vajo and Sara (née Radulović) from Drežnica, a village near Ogulin in modern-day Croatia. After college, he played professional basketball with the Youngstown Bears (1945–1946) of the National Basketball League, and the Pittsburgh Ironmen (1946–1947) of the Basketball Association of America.

Press Maravich's first head coaching job at the college level was West Virginia Wesleyan College, 1949–1950. From there he went on to become head coach of his alma mater, Davis & Elkins, from 1950 to 1952. He had previously served as an assistant under Red Brown from 1947 to 1949.

Maravich was head coach of the Tigers of Clemson University from 1956 to 1962. He then went to North Carolina State University to be an assistant coach under Everett Case. Maravich took over the head coaching duties when health problems, primarily cancer, forced Case to retire early in the 1964–1965 season. Maravich led the Wolfpack to the Atlantic Coast Conference title that season. Maravich left for Louisiana State University in April 1966 where he coached his son, Pete Maravich. Upon offering the LSU scholarship to "Pistol", "Press" told his boy that "If you don't sign this ... don't ever come into my house again."{Pistol: The Life of Pete Maravich}. Pete originally wanted to go to the West Virginia University but finally agreed to go to LSU if his dad bought him a car. (Pistol: The Life of Pete Maravich.) In spite of coaching his prolific son for half of his coaching career at LSU, Maravich had an overall losing record at the school. Maravich was replaced at LSU by Dale Brown in 1972. He then went on to coach the Mountaineers of Appalachian State, shepherding them through their early years in Division I, before retiring from coaching in 1975. Maravich returned to coaching in the early 1980s as associate head coach at Campbell University.

Death
In the spring of 1985, Maravich was diagnosed with prostate cancer. During a basketball clinic in Israel, signs of his condition appeared when he had begun to urinate blood. Press eventually was persuaded to receive proper treatment for his condition at Memorial Sloan-Kettering Cancer Center in New York, but he canceled before being admitted. On February 11, 1987, Press and son Pete flew to Hanover, Germany, for an experimental treatment that lasted for 11 days; symptoms such as coughing subsided while the treatment had no effect on the cancer. Through the next two months, Press's condition deteriorated while Pete took constant care of him with his sister, Diana. Press Maravich lived his last days in Highland Park Hospital in Covington, Louisiana, where he died on April 15, 1987. "Press" Maravich lived just long enough to see Pete selected as a possible member of the Naismith Memorial Basketball Hall of Fame, but not long enough to see him officially inducted in May 1987. Pete Maravich is quoted as saying "I'll see you soon" to his father immediately after his death; Pete Maravich died nine months later on January 5, 1988. Both "Press" and his son became born-again Christians late in their lives.

BAA career statistics

Regular season

Head coaching record

College

Further reading

References

External links

1915 births
1987 deaths
American men's basketball coaches
American men's basketball players
American people of Serbian descent
Appalachian State Mountaineers men's basketball coaches
Basketball coaches from Pennsylvania
Basketball players from Pennsylvania
Clemson Tigers men's basketball coaches
College men's basketball head coaches in the United States
Davis & Elkins Senators men's basketball coaches
Davis & Elkins Senators men's basketball players
Deaths from cancer in Louisiana
Deaths from prostate cancer
Detroit Eagles players
High school basketball coaches in the United States
LSU Tigers basketball coaches
NC State Wolfpack men's basketball coaches
People from Aliquippa, Pennsylvania
Pittsburgh Ironmen players
Sportspeople from the Pittsburgh metropolitan area
United States Naval Aviators
West Virginia Wesleyan Bobcats basketball coaches
Youngstown Bears players
Guards (basketball)
Military personnel from Pennsylvania